The International Festival of Hockey is a men's and women's invitational, international field hockey tournament hosted annually by Hockey Australia. The tournament is held in the Victorian cities of Bendigo and Melbourne.

Format
Founded in 2016, the International Festival of Hockey hosts two stages of competition in both the men's and women's events.

The first stage of the competition comprises a series of test matches in both the men's and women's events. The test matches are held in Bendigo at the Bendigo Hockey Complex.

The second stage of the competition is a men's and women's competitive tournament held at the State Netball and Hockey Centre in the Victorian capital, Melbourne. The women's tournament has been altered to match the men's, as the number of women's teams has increased at the 2017 edition from two teams to four, as well as the inclusion of a competitive tournament, which was absent at the 2016 edition.

Results

Men

Summaries

Team appearances

Results

Women

Summaries

Team appearances

References

 
International field hockey competitions hosted by Australia
Annual sporting events in Australia
Recurring sporting events established in 2016
2016 establishments in Australia
Festivals in Melbourne
Sports competitions in Melbourne
Sport in Bendigo